Turing Robot (aka Guangnian Wuxian, 图灵机器人) is a Chinese company that develops cognitive computing technology, deep learning, and intelligent robot operating systems. The company was founded in 2010 and is based in the Haidian District of Beijing, China. The CEO of Turing Robot is Yu Zhichen.

Overview
The company is the first Chinese company engaged in research on the commercialization of artificial intelligence (AI). Its founding members have over ten years of experience in AI research, including semantic recognition, cognitive computing, human-machine interaction, and machine learning.

The company was founded in 2010, and in 2012 released the "Wormhole Voice Assistant" application, which was the first Chinese intelligence-based voice assistant application.

In 2014, Turing released the first open platform for AI robots, also known as the Turing Robot. In November 2015, Turing OS was released.

Turing Robot Open Platform
Turing Robot Open Platform is now the world's largest chatbot open platform with the number of developers reached 600,000. Its Chinese semantic recognition accuracy is up to 94.7%, Turing Robot can provide intelligence-based software and hardware products with AI services covering Chinese semantic analysis, natural language and dialogue processing, DeepQA and more.

Since the official launch in November 2014, the Turing Robot has provided technical support to more than 230,000 developers and partners with over 130 billion total queries so far. The Turing Robot is used in many hardware and software fields, including domestic service robots, commercial service robots, companion robots for children, intelligent customer service systems, intelligent vehicle systems, and smart home control systems.

By simulating the cognitive and communicative behaviors of humans, the Turing Robot provides users with a conversation feature that provides intelligence-based interaction in hardware and software products, as well as the NLP Knowledge Base for customized life and business needs.  Meanwhile, the Turing Robot offers a package of 500 types of life service skills to accommodate product needs.

The Turing Robot comprehensively integrates over 500 kinds of life information and service skills into software and hardware products. Inquiries can be made about recipes, weather, delivery services, among other things.

Customized features of the Turing Robot
Features of the Turing Robot include personalized settings, keyword filtering, robot training, accuracy rate setting, and data statistics.

Application scenarios
Currently, there are more than 15 application cases for the Turing Robot, including smart robots, toys, vehicle systems, QQ robots, smart home, and smart custom service.

Turing OS
Turing OS is an intelligent robot operating system whose design is based on simulating the thinking mode and emotional recognition of humans, which provides natural and friendly multimode human-machine interaction methods. It includes a thinking enhancement engine, an affective computing engine and a self-learning engine.

Multimodal interactions
Turing OS introduces new multimodal interaction for robots that is closer to human capability that prior technology. With Turing OS installed, robots can understand voice, text, images, body movement, and other multimodal data from external sources such as humans. Meanwhile, they can provide simultaneous feedback, including through voice, text, and images.

Three engines

Affective Computing Engine
The Affective Computing Engine of Turing OS enables robots to have the same ability to demonstrate affection as humans. The Turing OS develops a mature affective computing engine for robots, which assists robots in understanding and expressing human emotions. The affective computing engine of the Turing OS has two components: human emotion recognition and human-like emotion expression.

Cognitive Enhancement Engine
The Cognitive Enhancement Engine of Turing OS enables robots to have the same thinking ability as humans. Based on research into human macro-thinking models and micro-thinking models, the Turing OS provides powerful thinking for robots, and enables robots to operate in multiple macro- and micro-thinking modes. As a result, these robots can have thinking ability similar to that of humans. Robots with the Turing OS attain the thinking level of children aged 4 to 5.

The Cognitive Enhancement Engine includes 26 types of macro thinking and 10,140 types of micro thinking.

Self-learning Engine
The Self-learning Engine enables robots to have the same learning abilities as humans.

Adopting an ultra-efficient algorithm for deep learning, Turing OS uses enormous big data sources and the operating environment of a supercomputer to provide robots with a powerful capacity for self-learning. This helps robots realize real-time fast iteration and updating of emotion recognition and expression, thinking models, knowledge construction, and adaptive scenarios.

Application services
Turing OS provides application services, covering 25 applicable scenarios, including English learning, family entertainment, knowledge learning, and operations control.

Turing OS v1.5
On The First Innovation Conference of Turing Robot, CEO of Turing Robot, Yu Zhichen released an updated version of Turing OS: Turing OS Version 1.5, with an added visual ability to its former edition.

Turing Robot Application Project
Turing Robot Application Project was also released on the Innovation Conference of Turing Robot, it includes official applications like Robots’ Chatting, Automatic Camera, Robots Singing and English Read-after. Besides that, the platform is free and open to developers to build their own apps on and Weather Report, Dictionary and Music Playlist were taken for a start.

Applications
The following applications for Turing Robot and Turing OS exist.

Turing Robot
 BOSCH Vehicle System
 HTC Voice: Little Hi
 China Telecom Customer Service
 Letou Carl Vehicle System
 JIMI Cat APP
 Kido Smart Watch

Turing OS
 Super Wings Robot
 Doraemon
 Robotant
 Hahabot
 Luobotec
 Albert Robot
 Tuba Robot

See also
 List of things named after Alan Turing

References

Chinese companies established in 2010
Robotics companies
Companies based in Beijing
Information technology companies of China
Chinese brands
Robots of China
Alan Turing